Posoquerieae is a tribe of flowering plants in the family Rubiaceae and contains 23 species in 2 genera. Its representatives are found from Mexico to tropical South America.

Genera 
Currently accepted names
 Molopanthera Turcz. (1 sp) 
 Posoqueria Aubl. (22 sp)

Synonyms
 Cyrtanthus Schreb. = Posoqueria
 Kyrtanthus J.F.Gmel. = Posoqueria
 Martha F.J.Müll. = Posoqueria
 Posoria Raf. = Posoqueria
 Ramspekia Scop. = Posoqueria
 Solena Lour. = Posoqueria
 Stannia H.Karst. = Posoqueria
 Willdenovia J.F.Gmel. = Posoqueria

References 

Ixoroideae tribes
Posoquerieae